Azra Avdic (born 19 September 1998) is a Peruvian swimmer. She competed in the women's 200 metre butterfly event at the 2017 World Aquatics Championships.

References

External links
 

1998 births
Living people
Peruvian female butterfly swimmers
Place of birth missing (living people)
South American Games silver medalists for Peru
South American Games bronze medalists for Peru
South American Games medalists in swimming
Competitors at the 2018 South American Games
Swimmers at the 2019 Pan American Games
Pan American Games competitors for Peru
21st-century Peruvian women